Witness for the Prosecution is a play adapted by Agatha Christie from her 1925 short story "Traitor's Hands". The play opened in London on 28 October 1953 at the Winter Garden Theatre (although the first performance had been in Nottingham on 28 September). It was produced by Sir Peter Saunders.

Reception of London production
The Times of 29 October 1953 was enthusiastic in its praise stating, "The author has two ends in view, and she attains them both. She takes us now into the Old Bailey during an exciting trial for murder, now into chambers where the human reactions of the lawyers engaged in the case may be studied; and when the trial is over and there seems no more to be said, she swiftly ravels again the skein which the law has confidently unravelled and leaves herself with a denouement which is at once surprising and credible." The reviewer outlined the basics of the plot, commenting that Patricia Jessel's performance in the dock was "cold-blooded" and that she "makes a clear-cut image of hatred releasing itself suddenly from inhibitions which have become intolerable" and that Derek Blomfield was "equally good". The greatest praise was reserved for the climax:  "Mrs Christie has by this time got the audience in her pocket. A timely intervention of a woman of the streets offering new evidence seems precisely what the trial needs and when it is resumed the evidence brings it triumphantly to a satisfying conclusion. It is only then that the accomplished thriller writer shows her real hand."

Ivor Brown of The Observer said in the issue of 1 November 1953 that the play had, "all the usual advantages of Counsel in conflict, agonised outbreak in the dock, and back-answers from the witness-box. To these are added a considerable and ingenious appendix; the jury's verdict is only the beginning of a story that has as many twists as a pigtail." He summed up with a comment on the performance of Patricia Jessel, who "takes the title-part with cool efficiency. Whether she is snake in the grass or butterfly on the wheel playgoers must find out for themselves. There will be plenty doing that."

Philip Hope-Wallace in The Guardians issue of 30 October 1953 said of the ending, "Justice has been done and has been seen to be done. We nod approvingly, at which moment Mrs Christie says in effect "Oh, so you thought that did you?" and with an unforeseen twist of the cards lets us see how wrong we were. This is satisfying, but it makes criticism almost impossible; first, one must not give away the clue and second, one must reconsider whether those witnesses who seemed the most plausible were not, in fact, less good players than those who seemed somehow not quite 'in character'". Nevertheless, Hope-Wallace did admit that the opening night was "a great success" and stated that the play presented a "well-made, humorous, exciting case".

Credits of London production
 Director: Wallace Douglas
 Cast:Rosalie Westwater as Greta, typist to Sir Wilfrid
Walter Horsbrugh as Carter, Sir Wilfrid's Chief Clerk/Alderman
Milton Rosmer as Mr Mayhew, a solicitor
Derek Blomfield as Leonard Vole
David Horne as Sir Wilfrid Robarts, QC
David Raven as Inspector Hearne
Kenn Kennedy as Plain-Clothes Detective/Third Member of the Jury
Patricia Jessel as Romaine
Philip Holles as Clerk of the Court
Percy Marmont as Mr Justice Wainright
D. A. Clarke-Smith as Mr Myers, QC
Nicolas Tannar as Court Usher
John Bryning as Court Stenographer
Denzil Ellis as Warder
Muir Little as The Judge's Clerk
George Dudley as First Barrister
Jack Bulloch as Second Barrister
Lionel Gadsen as Third Barrister
John Farries Moss as Fourth Barrister
Richard Coke as Fifth Barrister
Agnes Fraser as Sixth Barrister
Lauderdale Beckett as First Member of the Jury
Iris Fraser Foss as Second Member of the Jury
David Homewood as a Policeman
Graham Stuart as Dr. Wyatt, a Police Surgeon#
Jean Stewart as Janet MacKenzie
Peter Franklin as Mr. Clegg, a laboratory assistant
Rosemary Wallace as The Other Woman

The cast list, to preserve the surprise ending in the final scene, lists one character simply as "The Other Woman". Until that final scene audiences are meant to believe that "The Other Woman" refers to an appearance by Romaine in disguise. This is to hide the appearance of the "other" Other Woman in the closing moments. In 1995 Mystery Writers of America included the play In their list of The Top 100 Mystery Novels of All Time.

Broadway production
The play opened in America at Henry Miller's Theatre, New York City on 16 December 1954. It was produced by Gilbert Miller and Peter Saunders.  Patricia Jessel was the only member of the cast to transfer from the London production.The Times reported on the success of the production in its issue of 23 December 1954 when they quoted a review in the New York Herald Tribune which said that the play should be, "A walloping success. The finish is done with such dedicated conviction, such patent plausibility, such respect for the medium as a thing of beauty that you are apt to find yourself gasping out loud."

Jessel and Francis L. Sullivan both won Tony Awards for their roles, and Christie won an Edgar Award from the Mystery Writers of America for Best Mystery Play. The play ran for 645 performances, closing on 30 June 1956.

Credits of Broadway production
 Director: Robert Lewis
 Cast:Gordon Nelson as Carter
Mary Barclay as Greta
Francis L. Sullivan as Sir Wilfred Robarts, Q.C.
Robin Craven as Mr Mayhew, a solicitor
Gene Lyons as Leonard Vole
Claude Horton as Inspector Hearne
Ralph Leonard as Plain-Clothes Detective
Patricia Jessel as Romaine
Dolores Rashid as Third Juror
Andrew George as Second Juror
Jack Bittner as Foreman of the Jury
Arthur Oshlag as Court Usher
Ronald Dawson as Clerk of the Court
Ernest Clark as Mr Myers, QC
Horace Braham as Mr Justice Wainwright
R. Cobden-Smith as Alderman
Harold Webster as Judge's Clerk
W. H. Thomas as Court Stenographer
Ralph Roberts as Warder
Henry Craig Nelson as Barrister
Brace Conning as Barrister
Ruth Greene as Barrister
Albert Richards as Barrister
Franklyn Monroe as Barrister
Sam Kramer as Barrister
Bryan Herbert as Policeman
Guy Spaull as Dr Wyatt
Una O'Connor as Janet MacKenzie
Michael McAloney as Mr Clegg
Dawn Steinkamp (pseudonym) as The Other Woman

Publication and further adaptations
The play was first published in the UK in Famous Plays of 1954 by Victor Gollancz Ltd in 1954. The first printing in the US was in the same year in a paperback edition by Samuel French Ltd. French also published the play in the UK in 1957 as French's Acting Edition No 648 priced at five shillings. It was reprinted in hardback for the US market in The Mousetrap and Other Plays by G. P. Putnam's Sons in 1978 and in the UK by HarperCollins in 1993.

The very first performance of the story, just pre-dating the debut of Christie's play, was in the form of a live telecast which aired on CBS Television's Lux Video Theatre on 17 September 1953 and which starred Edward G. Robinson (making his television debut), Andrea King, and Tom Drake.

The film version, based on Christie's play, was released on 6 February 1958 and directed by Billy Wilder. Charles Laughton played Sir Wilfred, Marlene Dietrich played Romaine (renamed Christine) and Tyrone Power played Leonard Vole in his second to last role. A character not in the play, Sir Wilfred's nurse, Miss Plimsoll, was created for the film and played by Laughton's wife, Elsa Lanchester. Una O'Connor who had played Janet MacKenzie, the housekeeper of the murder victim, on the New York stage, reprised her role in the film. Laughton and Lanchester were nominated for Academy Awards.

A 1982 adaptation was made for television with Sir Ralph Richardson, Deborah Kerr, Beau Bridges, Donald Pleasence, Dame Wendy Hiller and Diana Rigg. It was adapted by Lawrence B. Marcus and John Gay from the original screenplay and directed by Alan Gibson.

Theatre Mill - 2014 production

In April 2014, the first ever site-specific production of the play opened at York Guildhall from York-based company, Theatre Mill, and was fully supported by Agatha Christie Ltd. To celebrate the world premiere, there was a Q&A with the director and cast following the opening night performance. According to reports, it was always Christie's wish to see the play in a site-specific location. The production was staged in the city's council chambers (using most of the building and played in-the-round) and was directed by Samuel Wood. The cast included: David Bowen, Rachel Logan, Andrew Dowbiggin, Adam Elms, and Clive Moore. It received very positive reviews.

2015 revival
Theatre Mill's production was revived at the York Guildhall from June 2015 before transferring to Leeds Civic Hall, again garnering extremely positive reviews. Logan, Elms, and Moore reprised their roles and were joined by Gordon Kane and Niall Costigan.

London County Hall production - 2017 to present 

In October 2017, a unique courtroom staging of the play opened at London County Hall to critical acclaim. Performances were suspended in March 2020 due to the COVID-19 pandemic in the United Kingdom, and resumed in September 2021. The show is set to run until April 2023. Produced by Eleanor Lloyd Productions and Rebecca Stafford Productions this site-specific production is set in the magnificent surroundings of the chamber inside the historic London County Hall.

Credits of Original County Hall, London production
 Director: Lucy BaileyDesigner: William DudleyLighting Designer: Chris DaveySound Designer: Mic PoolCasting Director:' Ellie Collyer-Bristow CDG

References

1953 plays
British plays adapted into films
Plays by Agatha Christie